Loricaria nickeriensis is a species of catfish in the family Loricariidae. It is native to South America, where it occurs in the basins of the Nickerie River and the Maroni in French Guiana and Suriname. The species reaches 12 cm (4.7 inches) in standard length and is believed to be a facultative air-breather.

References 

Loricariidae
Fish described in 1979